English orthography is the writing system used to represent spoken English, allowing readers to connect the graphemes to sound and to meaning. It includes English's norms of spelling, hyphenation, capitalisation, word breaks, emphasis, and punctuation.

Like the orthography of most world languages, English orthography has a broad degree of standardisation. This standardisation began to develop when movable type spread to England in the late 15th century. However, unlike with most languages, there are multiple ways to spell every phoneme, and most letters also represent multiple pronunciations depending on their position in a word and the context.

This is partly due to the large number of words that have been borrowed from a large number of other languages throughout the history of English, without successful attempts at complete spelling reforms, and partly due to accidents of history, such as some of the earliest mass-produced English publications being typeset by highly trained, multilingual printing compositors, who occasionally used a spelling pattern more typical for another language. For example, the word ghost was spelled gost in Middle English, until the Flemish spelling pattern was unintentionally substituted, and happened to be accepted. Most of the spelling conventions in Modern English were derived from the phonemic spelling of a variety of Middle English, and generally do not reflect the sound changes that have occurred since the late 15th century (such as the Great Vowel Shift). As a result of this, many words are spelled the way that they were pronounced more than 600 years ago, instead of being spelled like they are pronounced in the 21st century.

Despite the various English dialects spoken from country to country and within different regions of the same country, there are only slight regional variations in English orthography, the two most recognised variations being British and American spelling, and its overall uniformity helps facilitate international communication. On the other hand, it also adds to the discrepancy between the way English is written and spoken in any given location.

Function of the letters

Phonemic representation 

Letters in English orthography usually represent a particular phoneme.

Sequences of letters may perform this role as well as single letters. Thus, in thrash , the digraph  (two letters) represents . In hatch , the trigraph  represents .

Less commonly, a single letter can represent multiple successive sounds.

The same letter (or sequence of letters) may be pronounced differently when occurring in different positions within a word. For instance,  represents  at the end of some words (tough ) but not in others (plough ). At the beginning of syllables,  is pronounced , as in ghost . Conversely,  is never pronounced  in syllable onsets other than in inflected forms, and is almost never pronounced  in syllable codas (the proper name Pittsburgh is an exception).

Some words contain silent letters, which do not represent any sound in modern English pronunciation.

Word origin 

Another type of spelling characteristic is related to word origin. For example, when representing a vowel,  represents the sound  in some words borrowed from Greek (reflecting an original upsilon), whereas the letter usually representing this sound in non-Greek words is the letter . Thus, myth  is of Greek origin, while pith  is a Germanic word.

Other examples include  pronounced  (which is most commonly ), and  pronounced  (which is most commonly  or )—the use of these spellings for these sounds often mark words that have been borrowed from Greek.

Homophone differentiation 

Spelling may also be useful to distinguish between homophones (words with the same pronunciation but different meanings), although in most cases the reason for the difference is historical and was not introduced for the purpose of making a distinction.

For example, heir and air are pronounced identically in most dialects, but, in writing, they are distinguished from each other by their different spellings.

Another example is the pair of homophones pain and pane, where both are pronounced  but have two different spellings of the vowel . Later  became a diphthong .

In written language, this may help to resolve potential ambiguities that would arise otherwise (cf. He's breaking the car vs. He's braking the car).

Nevertheless, many homophones remain that are unresolved by spelling (for example, the word bay has at least five fundamentally different meanings).

Marking sound changes in other letters 

Some letters in English provide information about the pronunciation of other letters in the word. Rollings (2004) uses the term "markers" for such letters. Letters may mark different types of information.

 also often marks an altered pronunciation of a preceding vowel.

A single letter may even fill multiple pronunciation-marking roles simultaneously. In the word vague,  marks the long  sound, but  keeps the  hard rather than soft.

Doubled consonants usually indicate that the preceding vowel is pronounced short.

Multiple functionality 

Any given letters may have dual functions.

Underlying representation 

Like many other alphabetic orthographies, English spelling does not represent non-contrastive phonetic sounds (that is, minor differences in pronunciation which are not used to distinguish between different words).

Although the letter  is pronounced by some speakers with aspiration  at the beginning of words, this is never indicated in the spelling, and, indeed, this phonetic detail is probably not noticeable to the average native speaker not trained in phonetics.

However, unlike some orthographies, English orthography often represents a very abstract underlying representation (or morphophonemic form) of English words.

In these cases, a given morpheme (i.e., a component of a word) has a fixed spelling even though it is pronounced differently in different words. As it happens, these different pronunciations of - can be predicted by a few phonological rules, but that is not the reason why its spelling is fixed.

Another example involves the vowel differences (with accompanying stress pattern changes) in several related words. For instance, photographer is derived from photograph by adding the derivational suffix -. When this suffix is added, the vowel pronunciations change largely owing to the moveable stress:

Other examples of this type are the - suffix (as in agile vs. agility, acid vs. acidity, divine vs. divinity, sane vs. sanity). See also: Trisyllabic laxing.

Another example includes words like mean  and meant , where  is pronounced differently in the two related words. Thus, again, the orthography uses only a single spelling that corresponds to the single morphemic form rather than to the surface phonological form.

English orthography does not always provide an underlying representation; sometimes it provides an intermediate representation between the underlying form and the surface pronunciation. This is the case with the spelling of the regular plural morpheme, which is written as either - (as in tat, tats and hat, hats) or - (as in glass, glasses). Thus, there are two different spellings that correspond to the single underlying representation || of the plural suffix and the three surface forms.

The abstract representation of words as indicated by the orthography can be considered advantageous since it makes etymological relationships more apparent to English readers. This makes writing English more complex, but arguably makes reading English more efficient. However, very abstract underlying representations, such as that of Chomsky & Halle (1968) or of underspecification theories, are sometimes considered too abstract to accurately reflect the communicative competence of native speakers. Followers of these arguments believe the less abstract surface forms are more "psychologically real" and thus more useful in terms of pedagogy.</ref>

Diacritics

English has some words that can be written with accents. These words are mostly loanwords, usually from French. As they become increasingly naturalised, there is an increasing tendency to omit the accent marks, even in formal writing. For example, rôle and hôtel originally had accents when they were borrowed into English, but now the accents are almost never used. The words were originally considered foreign—and some people considered that English alternatives were preferable—but today their foreign origin is largely forgotten. Words most likely to retain the accent are those atypical of English morphology and therefore still perceived as slightly foreign. For example, café and pâté both have a pronounced final , which would otherwise be silent under the normal English pronunciation rules. However, café is now sometimes facetiously pronounced /kæf/, while in pâté, the acute accent is helpful to distinguish it from pate.

Further examples of words sometimes retaining diacritics when used in English are: ångström (partly because the scientific symbol for this unit of measurement is "Å"), appliqué, attaché, blasé, bric-à-brac, Brötchen, cliché, crème, crêpe, façade, fiancé(e), flambé, jalapeño, naïve, naïveté, né(e), papier-mâché, passé, piñata, protégé, résumé, risqué, über-, and voilà. Italics, with appropriate accents, are generally applied to foreign terms that are uncommonly used in or have not been assimilated into English: for example, adiós, crème brûlée, pièce de résistance, raison d'être, über, vis-à-vis, and belles-lettres.

It was formerly common in American English to use a diaeresis to indicate a hiatus, e.g. coöperate, daïs, and reëlect. The New Yorker and Technology Review magazines still use it for this purpose, even though it is increasingly rare in modern English. Nowadays, the diaeresis is normally left out (cooperate), or a hyphen is used (co-operate) if the hiatus is between two morphemes in a compound word. It is, however, still common in monomorphemic loanwords such as naïve and Noël.

Written accents are also used occasionally in poetry and scripts for dramatic performances to indicate that a certain normally unstressed syllable in a word should be stressed for dramatic effect, or to keep with the metre of the poetry. This use is frequently seen in archaic and pseudoarchaic writings with the -ed suffix, to indicate that the  should be fully pronounced, as with cursèd.

The acute and grave accents are occasionally used in poetry and lyrics: the acute to indicate stress overtly where it might be ambiguous (rébel vs. rebél) or nonstandard for metrical reasons (caléndar); the grave to indicate that an ordinarily silent or elided syllable is pronounced (warnèd, parlìament).

Ligatures 

In some cases, usage may vary; for instance, both encyclopedia and encyclopaedia are current in the UK.

Phonic irregularities 

Partly because English has never had any official regulating authority for spelling, such as the Spanish Real Academia Española, the French Académie française, and the German Rat für deutsche Rechtschreibung, English spelling, compared to many other languages, is quite irregular and complex. Although French, among other languages, presents a similar degree of difficulty when encoding (writing), English is more difficult when decoding (reading), as there are clearly many more possible pronunciations of a group of letters. For example, in French,  (as in "true", but short), can be spelled  (ou, nous, tout, choux), but the pronunciation of each of those sequences is always the same. In English,  can be spelled in up to 24 different ways, including  (spook, truth, suit, blues, to, shoe, group, through, few) (see Sound-to-spelling correspondences below), but all of these have other pronunciations as well (e.g., as in foot, us, build, bluest, so, toe, grout, plough, sew) (See the Spelling-to-sound correspondences below). Thus, in unfamiliar words and proper nouns, the pronunciation of some sequences,  being the prime example, is unpredictable to even educated native English speakers.

Spelling irregularities 

Attempts to regularise or reform the spelling of English have usually failed. However, Noah Webster popularised more phonetic spellings in the United States, such as flavor for British flavour, fiber for fibre, defense for defence, analyze for analyse, catalog for catalogue, and so forth. These spellings already existed as alternatives, but Webster's dictionaries helped standardise them in the US. (See American and British English spelling differences for details.)

Besides the quirks the English spelling system has inherited from its past, there are other irregularities in spelling that make it tricky to learn. English contains, depending on dialect, 24–27 consonant phonemes and 13–20 vowels. However, there are only 26 letters in the modern English alphabet, so there is not a one-to-one correspondence between letters and sounds. Many sounds are spelled using different letters or multiple letters, and for those words whose pronunciation is predictable from the spelling, the sounds denoted by the letters depend on the surrounding letters.

It is, however, not (solely) the shortage of letters which makes English spelling irregular. Its irregularities are caused mainly by the use of many different spellings for some of its sounds, such as /uː/, /iː/ and /oʊ/ (too, true, shoe, flew, through; sleeve, leave, even, seize, siege; stole, coal, bowl, roll, old, mould), and the use of identical sequences for spelling different sounds (over, oven, move).

Furthermore, English no longer makes any attempt to anglicise the spellings of loanwords, but preserves the foreign spellings, even when they do not follow English spelling conventions like the Polish  in Czech (rather than *Check) or the Norwegian  in fjord (although fiord was formerly the most common spelling). In early Middle English, until roughly 1400, most imports from French were respelled according to English rules (e.g. bataille–battle, bouton–button, but not double, or trouble). Instead of loans being respelled to conform to English spelling standards, sometimes the pronunciation changes as a result of pressure from the spelling, e.g. ski, adopted from Norwegian in the mid-18th century. It used to be pronounced , similar to the Norwegian pronunciation, but the increasing popularity of the sport after the mid-20th century helped the  pronunciation replace it.

There was also a period when the spelling of a small number of words was altered to make them conform to their perceived etymological origins.

The spelling of English continues to evolve. Many loanwords come from languages where the pronunciation of vowels corresponds to the way they were pronounced in Old English, which is similar to the Italian or Spanish pronunciation of the vowels, and is the value the vowel symbols  have in the International Phonetic Alphabet. As a result, there is a somewhat regular system of pronouncing "foreign" words in English, and some borrowed words have had their spelling changed to conform to this system. For example, Hindu used to be spelled Hindoo, and the name Maria used to be pronounced like the name Mariah, but was changed to conform to this system. This only further complicates the spelling, however. On the one hand, words that retained anglicised spellings may be misread in a hyperforeign way. On the other hand, words that are respelled in a 'foreign' way may be misread as if they are English words, e.g. Muslim was formerly spelled Mooslim because of its original pronunciation.

Commercial advertisers have also had an effect on English spelling. They introduced new or simplified spellings like lite instead of light, thru instead of through, and rucsac instead of rucksack. The spellings of personal names have also been a source of spelling innovations: diminutive versions of women's names that sound the same as men's names have been spelled differently: Nikki and Nicky, Toni and Tony, Jo and Joe. The differentiation in between names that are spelled differently but have the same phonetic sound may come from modernisation or different countries of origin. For example, Isabelle and Isabel sound the same but are spelled differently; these versions are from France and Spain respectively.

In the other direction,  can be spelled in at least 18~21 different ways: be (cede), ski (machine), bologna (GA), algae, quay, beach, bee, deceit, people, key, keyed, field (hygiene), amoeba, chamois (GA), dengue (GA), beguine, guyot, and ynambu (See Sound-to-spelling correspondences). (These examples assume a more-or-less standard non-regional British English accent. Other accents will vary.)

Sometimes everyday speakers of English change a counterintuitive pronunciation simply because it is counterintuitive. Changes like this are not usually seen as "standard", but can become standard if used enough. An example is the word miniscule, which still competes with its original spelling of minuscule, though this might also be because of analogy with the word mini.

History 

Inconsistencies and irregularities in English pronunciation and spelling have gradually increased in number throughout the history of the English language. There are a number of contributing factors. First, gradual changes in pronunciation, such as the Great Vowel Shift, account for a tremendous number of irregularities. Second, relatively recent loan words generally carry their original spellings, which are often not phonetic in English. The Romanization of languages (e.g., Chinese) has further complicated this problem, for example when pronouncing Chinese proper names (of people or places).

The regular spelling system of Old English was swept away by the Norman Conquest, and English itself was supplanted in some spheres by Norman French for three centuries, eventually emerging with its spelling much influenced by French. English had also borrowed large numbers of words from French, and kept their French spellings. The spelling of Middle English is very irregular and inconsistent, with the same word being spelled in different ways, sometimes even in the same sentence. However, these were generally much better guides to the then-pronunciation than modern English spelling is.

( were written identically with two minims in Norman handwriting;  was written as two  letters;  was written with three minims, hence  looked like , etc.). Similarly, spelling conventions also prohibited final . Hence the identical spellings of the three different vowel sounds in love, move, and cove are due to ambiguity in the Middle English spelling system, not sound change.

In 1417, Henry V began using English, which had no standardised spelling, for official correspondence instead of Latin or French which had standardised spelling, e.g. Latin had one spelling for right (rectus), Old French as used in English law had six and Middle English had 77. This motivated writers to standardise English spelling, an effort which lasted about 500 years.

Most of these changes happened before the arrival of printing in England. However, the arrival of the modern printing press in 1476 froze the current system, rather than providing the impetus for a realignment of spelling with pronunciation. Furthermore, it introduced further inconsistencies, partly because of the use of typesetters trained abroad, particularly in the Low Countries. The addition and deletion of a silent e at the ends of words was also sometimes used to make the right-hand margin line up more neatly.

By the time dictionaries were introduced in the mid-17th century, the spelling system of English had started to stabilise. By the 19th century, most words had set spellings, though it took some time before they diffused throughout the English-speaking world. In The Mill on the Floss (1860), English novelist George Eliot satirised the attitude of the English rural gentry of the 1820s towards orthography:

The modern English spelling system, with its national variants, spread together with the expansion of public education later in the 19th century.

"Ough" words 

The most notorious multigraph in the English language is the tetragraph , which can be pronounced in at least ten different ways, six of which are illustrated in the construct, Though the tough cough and hiccough plough him through, which is quoted by Robert A. Heinlein in The Door into Summer to illustrate the difficulties facing automated speech transcription and reading. Ough itself is a word, an exclamation of disgust similar to ugh, though rarely known or used. The following are typical pronunciations of this string of letters:

  (as in so) for though and dough
  (as in cuff) for  tough, rough, enough, and the name Hough
  (as in off) for trough, cough, and Gough
  (as in blue) for through
  (as in saw) for thought, ought, sought, nought, brought, etc.
  (as in comma) for thorough, borough, and names ending in -borough; however, American English pronounces this as 
  (as in how) as in bough, sough, drought, plough (plow in North America), doughty, and the names Slough and Doughty

The following pronunciations are found in uncommon single words:
 hough:  (more commonly spelled "hock" now)
 hiccough (a now-uncommon variant of hiccup):  as in up (unique)

The place name Loughborough uses two different pronunciations of : the first  has the sound as in cuff and the second rhymes with thorough.

Spelling-to-sound correspondences 

Notes:

 In the tables, the hyphen has two different meanings. A hyphen after the letter indicates that it must be at the beginning of a syllable, e.g., - in jumper and ajar. A hyphen before the letter indicates that it cannot be at the beginning of a word, e.g., - in sick and ticket.
 More specific rules take precedence over more general ones, e.g., "- before " takes precedence over "".
 Where the letter combination is described as "word-final", inflectional suffixes may be added without changing the pronunciation, e.g., catalogues.
 The dialect used is RP. Several entries are indicated as specifically being GA.
 Isolated foreign borrowings are excluded.

Vowels 

In a generative approach to English spelling, Rollings (2004) identifies twenty main orthographic vowels of stressed syllables that are grouped into four main categories: "Lax", "Tense", "Heavy", "Tense-R".

For instance,  can represent the lax vowel , tense , heavy , or tense-r .

Tense vowels are distinguished from lax vowels with a "silent"  that is added at the end of words. Thus,  in hat is lax , but when  is added in the word hate  is tense .

Besides silent , another strategy for indicating tense and tense-r vowels, is the addition of another orthographic vowel forming a digraph. In this case, the first vowel is usually the main vowel while the second vowel is the "marking" vowel. These two strategies produce words that are spelled differently but pronounced identically, which helps differentiate words that would otherwise be homonyms, as in mane (silent  strategy), main (digraph strategy) and Maine (both strategies).

Besides the 20 basic vowel spellings,  has a reduced vowel category (representing the sounds ) and a miscellaneous category (representing the sounds  and +V, +V, V+V).

Combinations of vowel letters 

To reduce dialectal difficulties, the sound values given here correspond to the conventions at Help:IPA/English. This table includes  when they represent vowel sounds. If no information is given, it is assumed that the vowel is in a stressed syllable.

Deriving the pronunciation of an English word from its spelling requires not only a careful knowledge of the rules given below (many of which are not explicitly known even by native speakers: speakers merely learn the spelling of a word along with its pronunciation) and their many exceptions, but also:

 a knowledge of which syllables are stressed and which are unstressed (not derivable from the spelling: compare hallow and allow)
 which combinations of vowels represent monosyllables and which represent disyllables (ditto: compare waive and naive, creature and creator)

Consonants

Combinations of vowel letters and

Combinations of other consonant and vowel letters

Sound-to-spelling correspondences 

The following table shows for each sound the various spelling patterns used to denote it, starting with the prototypical pattern(s) followed by others in alphabetical order. An ellipsis stands for an intervening consonant.

Consonants 
Arranged in the order of the IPA consonant tables.

Vowels 
Sorted more or less from close to open sounds in the vowel diagram. Nasal vowels used by some speakers in words of French origin such as enceinte, are not included.

See also 
 False etymology
 Spelling bee
 List of English homographs
 The Chaos – a poem by Gerard Nolst Trenité demonstrating the irregularities of English spelling

 Conventions
 English plural
 I before E except after C
 Three letter rule

 Variant spelling
 American and British English spelling differences
 Misspelling
 Satiric misspelling
 Sensational spelling
 Spelling of disc

 Graphemes
 Apostrophe
 Eth
 Long s
 Thorn (letter)
 Yogh

 Phonetic orthographic systems
 English spelling reform
 Interspel

 English scripts
 English alphabet (Latin script)
 American manual alphabet
 Two-handed manual alphabets
 English braille
 American braille
 New York Point
 Shavian alphabet

 Words in English
 Lists of English words
 Classical compound
 Ghoti

 English phonology
 Regional accents of English
 IPA chart for English dialects
 Stress and vowel reduction in English
 Initial-stress-derived noun
 Traditional English pronunciation of Latin

Orthographies of English-related languages

 Germanic languages
 Danish
 Dutch
 German
 Icelandic
 Scots

 Romance languages
 French
 Italian
 Milanese
 Portuguese
 Spanish

Celtic languages
 Irish
 Scottish Gaelic
 Welsh

Historical languages
 Latin
 Old Norse
 Old English

Constructed languages
 Esperanto

Notes

References

Bibliography 

 
 
 
 
 
 
 
 
 
 
 
 
 
 
 .

External links 
 Rules for English Spelling: Adding Suffixes, QU Rule, i before e, Silent e, 'er' vs. 'or'
 Hou tu pranownse Inglish describes rules which predict a word's pronunciation from its spelling with 85% accuracy
 Free spelling information and Free spelling lessons in QuickTime movie format at The Phonics Page.

 
Spelling, English
Indo-European Latin-script orthographies
Linguistic history